Forty Shades of Blue is a 2005 independent film directed by Ira Sachs. It premiered at the 2005 Sundance Film Festival where it won the Grand Jury Prize. 

Sachs was inspired by the works of Ken Loach, including Kes (1969), Family Life (1971), and Looks and Smiles (1981), as well as Satyajit Ray’s Charulata (1964).

Plot 
Alan James is an aging music producer who lives in Memphis, Tennessee with his much younger Russian girlfriend Laura. Their life together is complicated by the presence of Alan’s adult son Michael from his previous marriage, who forces Laura to reflect on the nature of her impending marriage and her future prospects.

Cast 

 Rip Torn as Alan James
 Dina Korzun as Laura
 Darren E. Burrows as Michael James
 J. Blackfoot as himself
 Jerry Chipman as Shel
 Stuart Greer Tom Skolnick
 D'Army Bailey as Man (uncredited)

Reception
On Rotten Tomatoes, Forty Shades of Blue has an approval rating of 60% based on 52 reviews. The website’s critics consensus reads, "In its portrayal of a woman's awakening and disillusionment, Forty Shades of Blue is as nuanced as its title would suggest."

Forty Shades of Blue was placed at #92 on the Best Films of the Aughts list by Slant Magazine in February 2010. The film also won the Grand Jury Prize at the 2005 Sundance Film Festival.

Notes

External links
 

2005 films
2005 drama films
2005 independent films
Films directed by Ira Sachs
Films set in Tennessee
Films set in Memphis, Tennessee
Sundance Film Festival award winners
2000s English-language films